Audubon is an unincorporated community in Gordon County, in the U.S. state of Georgia.

History
A post office called Audubon was in operation from 1900 until 1911. The community was likely named for John James Audubon, the American ornithologist, naturalist, and painter.

References

Unincorporated communities in Gordon County, Georgia
Unincorporated communities in Georgia (U.S. state)